R v Krymowski, 2005 SCC 7, [2005] 1 SCR 101 was a decision by the Supreme Court of Canada on hate speech against the Roma people, also known as "Gypsies".

Background

When Roma refugees were allowed into Canada in 1997, a protest was staged by 25 neo-Nazis and other people in front of the motel where the refugees were staying. The protest followed weeks of public controversy in which a large number of public officials, members of the press and media, police and the general public spoke and wrote very harsh things about "gypsy" refugee claimants. Several major newspapers ran news articles and editorials highly critical of gypsy refugees, suggesting a culture of criminality and an abuse by the refugee claimants of Canada's immigration and social services systems.  One senior local official was even quoted as saying that gypsies "pimp their wives and daughters" and train their children to steal. The public mood towards the refugee claimants was especially grim because of ongoing major cuts to social programs, which were already putting local needy families at risk.

Three weeks into the controversy, the demonstration occurred, lasting approximately two hours. Protesters held signs that said, for example, "Honk if you hate Gypsies", "Canada is not a Trash Can", and "G.S.T. — Gypsies Suck Taxes". (The last is a reference to Canada's unpopular Goods and Services Tax, also known as GST.) The protesters did not refer to "Roma". Police described the protest as "peaceful". The trial judge agreed. One of the two lead detectives testified that the "essential message" of the demonstrators "was that "gypsy refugee claimants" should not be permitted to stay in Canada" and that "many people were expressing [that] view", before and after the demonstration. However, a large number of the protesters wore neo-Nazi paraphernalia.
 
Four months later, after intense public lobbying by pressure groups, the homes of a number of people believed to have been involved in the demonstration were raided by police. Seven people were charged with willful promotion of hatred against an "identifiable group", a crime under the Criminal Code. All persons charged ranged in age from 15–20. No public official or members of the media or police were charged.

The trial and pre-trial motions lasted 47 days, spread over 16 months, ending in March 2000. The defence called no evidence at trial. Instead, the defence argued that the Crown had failed to prove that the demonstrators specifically targeted "Roma". They had spoken only of "gypsies", which may or may not refer to Roma, and the Crown had called no evidence on the point. The Crown responded arguing, among other things, that the defence had already conceded the equivalence of "gypsies" and "Roma" and pointed to Exhibit 12, a written defence concession given at the request of the Crown. Attached to Exhibit 12 was an extract of an article authored by one Ian Hancock, which arguably used the words "Roma" and "Gypsies" to refer to the same people.  The article was selected by the Crown as "background" to the concession. Exhibit 12 read:

"On behalf of all accused, [defence counsel] Mr. Gomes and I [defence counsel Lindsay] admit that the Roma people are an identifiable group which were historically persecuted by the Nazis. I agree to admission of the section of the Hancock article entitled 'The Treatment of Roma in Nazi Germany' (pp 7–8) solely as background to the admission in the previous sentence and not as any further admission. I make no further admission and do not concede to admission of any of the rest of the Hancock article. Mr. Gomes agrees to all of the contents of this fax on behalf of his clients."

The trial judge made the following findings of fact with respect to Exhibit 12:

"The precise and unequivocal concession on the facsimile covering page by both defence counsel is that "the roma people are an identifiable group, which were historically persecuted by the Nazis." Solely on the basis of that concession, the defence consented to the admission of the remaining part of the two pages of the exhibit, solely as background to the admission, the previous statement, and nothing more. As a further qualification, the defence writes that there are no further admissions and nothing further is conceded from the rest of the article.  A review of the article suggests that the term roma and gypsies may be synonymous. However, whether they are one and the same is not clear. The concession from the defence does not go so far as to concede that they are one and the same, nor that gypsies are an identifiable group, historically persecuted by the Nazis.
...	
Regardless of what other discussions took place, Exhibit Number 12 is the final result of those discussions, and on its face is clear and unequivocal and would not in my view induce the Crown to believe that it is any more than clearly stated.
...
I put directly to Crown counsel in argument the question of which statements on the record made by the defence contributed directly or indirectly to the Crown’s omission or inadvertence.  The Crown was unable to direct me to any particular comments in the transcripts.  In my extensive review of the transcripts, I found no such statements."

The Crown also pointed to dictionary definitions of "gypsy" and "Roma".  The defence noted that the dictionary definitions of "gypsy" included "a cunning rogue" and that none of the definitions of "Roma" offered by the Crown referred to the word "gypsy".

The defence won the trial and the Crown appealed.

Both the Summary Conviction Appeal Court and later the Court of Appeal for Ontario upheld the acquittals.  The Court of Appeal found that "the term gypsy in its broadest sense is often used to refer to people who lead a nomadic life" and "conjures up unflattering or stereotypical images".  At the Court of Appeal, the Crown conceded that "not all people who are referred to as gypsies are in fact Roma".  The Crown appealed a third time, to the Supreme Court of Canada.

At the Supreme Court of Canada, the Crown conceded that no evidence was tendered at trial showing that the occupants of the motel where the demonstration occurred were in fact "Roma". Nevertheless, in its judgment several months later, the Supreme Court of Canada overturned the acquittals largely on the basis that, according to witnesses at trial, the motel housed "Roma".  The defence filed a motion for a re-hearing of the appeal. The motion was dismissed, without reasons.

Decision
The court overturned the dismissal and held, "The appeal should be allowed.  The acquittals are set aside and new trials ordered."

The decision of the Court was written by Justice Louise Charron. She first observed the hate speech law was discussed and held to be constitutional in the case R v Keegstra (1990). In Keegstra, it was found that the definition of the crime was specific enough to be enforceable and its infringement on freedom of expression was minimal. That meant that the Crown was obligated to show the protesters publicly promoted hatred against a racial or religious group. It was not disputed the Roma would be such a group. Moreover, the protesters targeted a specific group.

Charron faulted the trial finding as too focussed on the terms "Roma" and "Gypsies," and not on the general question of whether the protesters were attempting to promote hatred of the Roma. Charron emphasized the importance of studying the "totality of the evidence" and drawing reasonable conclusions to determine whether a group was subject to hate speech. It was suggested that evidence besides the use of the word "Gypsies" be considered. That included that the Roma were staying at a motel that was targeted, that neo-Nazi displays were used, and that the protesters advocated "White Power." Neo-Nazism was particularly important since the Nazi Germans persecuted the Roma in the Holocaust.

Finally, Charron noted that use of the words "Roma" and "Gypsies" as synonyms need not have been fully proven if it were reasonable enough to believe and not be disputed. The dictionaries used in the case made the use of the synonyms believable and understandable.

See also
 List of Supreme Court of Canada cases (McLachlin Court)

References

External links
 

Romani in Canada
Romani rights
Supreme Court of Canada cases
2005 in Canadian case law
Hate speech case law
Racism in Canada
Antiziganism in North America